Nanoscale iron particles are sub-micrometer particles of iron metal. They are highly reactive because of their large surface area. In the presence of oxygen and water, they rapidly oxidize to form free iron ions. They are widely used in medical and laboratory applications and have also been studied for remediation of industrial sites contaminated with chlorinated organic compounds.

Synthesis 
Iron nanoparticles can be synthesized by the reduction of Fe(II) or Fe(III) salt with sodium borohydride in an aqueous medium.

Reactivity 
When exposed to oxygen and water, iron oxidizes. This redox process can occur under either acidic or neutral/basic conditions:

2 Fe0(s) + 4 H+(aq) + O2(aq) → 2 Fe2+(aq) + 2 H2O(l)

 Fe0(s) + 2 H2O (aq) → Fe2+(aq) + H2(g) + 2 OH−(aq)

Research
Research has shown that nanoscale iron particles can be effectively used to treat several forms of ground contamination, including grounds contaminated by polychlorinated biphenyls (PCBs), chlorinated organic solvents, and organochlorine pesticides.  Nanoscale iron particle are easily transportable through ground water, allowing for in situ treatment.  Additionally, the nanoparticle-water slurry can be injected into the contaminated area and stay there for long periods of time. These factors combine to make this method cheaper than the most currently used alternative.

Researchers have found that although metallic iron nanoparticles remediate contaminants well, they tend to agglomerate on the soil surfaces.  In response, carbon nanoparticles and water-soluble polyelectrolytes have been used as supports to the metallic iron nanoparticles.  The hydrophobic contaminants adsorb to these supports, improving permeability in sand and soil.

In field tests have generally confirmed lab findings.  However, research is still ongoing and nanoscale iron particles are not yet commonly used for treating ground contamination.

See also
Health and safety hazards of nanomaterials
Environmental implications of nanotechnology

References
 
2.http://www.chalcogen.infim.ro/1771_Yuvakkaur.pdf

External links
National Nanotechnology Initiative
Nanotechnology methods to clean up water pollution
 Largescale production and applications of zero-valent iron nanoparticles (nZVI)

Nanoparticles by composition
Environmental science
Pollution control technologies
Iron